= BAFO =

BAFO as an acronym may refer to:

- Best And Final Offer, often a part of a Request For Proposal process
- British Association of Forensic Odontology
- BAFO Technologies Incorporated, manufacturer of cables and electronic devices
- British Air Forces of Occupation, successor to the RAF Second Tactical Air Force in Germany after 1945
